The Combinations of Workmen Act 1825 (6 Geo 4 c. 129) was an Act of Parliament of the United Kingdom, which prohibited trade unions from attempting to collectively bargain for better terms and conditions at work, and suppressed the right to strike.

Background
The 1825 Act followed on from the Combination Act 1799 and the Combination of Workmen Act 1824 (5 Geo. 4 c. 95). The 1824 Act repealed the Acts of 1799 and 1800, but this led to a wave of strikes. Accordingly, the Combinations of Workmen Act 1825 was passed to reimpose criminal sanctions for picketing and other methods of persuading workers not to work.

Content

This law made illegal any combinations not for the purposes of pressing for wage increases or for a change in working hours.

Repeal
The 1825 Act was recommended for amendment by the majority report of the Eleventh and Final Report of the Royal Commissioners appointed to Inquire into the Organisation and Rules of Trade Unions and Other Associations. It was wholly displaced by the Trade Union Act 1871.

See also
UK labour law
Le Chapelier Law 1791 in France sought to do the same
The Making of the English Working Class by E. P. Thompson

Notes

External links
Text of the Combination Act of 1800

United Kingdom Acts of Parliament 1825
Legal history of the United Kingdom
History of labour law
United Kingdom labour law
1825 in labor relations
Trade union legislation
British trade unions history